Mihail Velsvebel (9 November 1926 – 21 November 2008) was an Estonian middle-distance runner. He competed in the men's 1500 metres at the 1952 Summer Olympics, representing the Soviet Union.

References

1926 births
2008 deaths
Athletes (track and field) at the 1952 Summer Olympics
Estonian male middle-distance runners
Soviet male middle-distance runners
Olympic athletes of the Soviet Union
Sportspeople from Kuressaare